Woluwe-Saint-Lambert or Sint-Lambrechts-Woluwe (Dutch) is one of the 19 municipalities of the Brussels-Capital Region, Belgium. In common with all of Brussels' municipalities, it is legally bilingual (French–Dutch). In French, it is often spelt Woluwé-Saint-Lambert (with an acute accent on the first e) to reflect the Frenchified pronunciation of what was originally a Dutch place name, but the official spelling is without an accent. The Woluwe stream, from which it takes its name, flows through the municipality.

, the municipality had a population of 58,541 inhabitants. It is a prosperous residential area, with a mixture of flats and detached, semi-detached, and terraced houses, often compared to Uccle, another affluent Brussels municipality, as well as the 14th or 17th arrondissement in Paris.

The neighbouring municipality of Woluwe-Saint-Pierre also lies within the Brussels-Capital Region, while the former municipality of Sint-Stevens-Woluwe (Woluwe-Saint-Etienne in French) has been merged with three other municipalities (Zaventem, Nossegem and Sterrebeek) to form the municipality of Zaventem, which is in the province of Flemish Brabant in Flanders.

Geography
Woluwe hosts the medical faculties of the Université catholique de Louvain (UCLouvain) and its hospital, the Cliniques universitaires Saint-Luc on the UCLouvain Brussels Woluwe campus, as well as several shopping areas, notably the / and the Woluwe Shopping Center. Some of the municipality's major roads are named after prominent 20th-century Belgian statesmen, such as the prestigious Avenue de Broqueville/De Broquevillelaan and the Avenue Paul Hymans/Paul Hymanslaan. Line 1 (formerly line 1B) of the Brussels Metro runs under these roads.

History

Medieval origins
Several archaeological finds on the territory of Woluwe-Saint-Lambert show traces of human activity during the Bronze Age. The first historical mention of the village, however, dates from the 11th century, when some of the forested land near the Woluwe stream was cleared for farming. A church was built and dedicated to Saint Lambert, the 7th-century bishop of Maastricht who was martyred in Liège. At the end of the 12th century, the rights to the parish of Saint Lambert were given to the canons of the chapter of St. Michael and Gudula in Brussels. Various charitable organisations and hospitals then started acquiring land in this area. Throughout the Middle Ages, Woluwe was part of the Duchy of Brabant, governed under the usual feudal arrangement of those times. Among the Dukes' vassals were some powerful local lords and landowners. Some of Woluwe's territory also belonged to the powerful Forest Abbey in Forest and Park Abbey in Leuven.

16th century to present
Up until recently, the village was mostly rural, focusing mainly on agriculture. Starting in the 16th century, affluent nobles and clergymen from Brussels built châteaux in Woluwe, some of which are still visible today. True urbanisation, however, started only around 1900. Well-to-do neighbourhoods, which included some of the novel architectural styles of the Belle Époque such as Art Nouveau then Art Deco, straddled the newly built Boulevard Brand Whitlock/Brand Whitlocklaan.

The population of the municipality increased very quickly at this time, rising from 1,649 inhabitants in 1880 to 8,883 inhabitants 30 years later. By 1960, there were 36,960 people in the municipality, and since 1970 the population has been stable at around 47,000.

Nowadays, Woluwe-Saint-Lambert is still a mostly residential area, attracting rich and poor inhabitants from neighbouring Brussels.

Sights
 The surroundings of the Woluwe stream have been laid out as park areas, such as Woluwe Park (in neighbouring Woluwe-Saint-Pierre) and Malou Park. Older historical buildings, such as the Lindekemale watermill (now a restaurant), the Hof ter Musschen farm (now a seminar centre), and the 16th-century Slot Castle (now a chain restaurant), also tend to be found near the river.
 The Church of St. Lambert has a 12th-century Romanesque tower.
 The Marie la Misérable Chapel (14th century).
 The municipality's Art Deco Municipal Hall, built in the 1930s, is located above Tomberg metro station.
 The Wolubilis cultural village and theatre, located at / 1 (formerly / 251), were inaugurated in 2006.
 The neoclassical Château Malou, built in 1776.

Shopping

Woluwe-Saint-Lambert has many shopping streets around Tomberg and Gribaumont metro stations. Around Roodebeek station is one of Brussels' largest shopping centres: the Woluwe Shopping Center. The Woluwe Shopping Center serves most of eastern Brussels.

Transport

Woluwe-Saint-Lambert is served by the following stations on line 1 of the Brussels Metro: Joséphine-Charlotte, Gribaumont, Tomberg, Roodebeek, Vandervelde, Alma and Crainhem/Kraainem. Despite not having any rail connections, the E40 Motorway, as well as many bus routes, run through the municipality. Since 2018, tram 94 has been extended from Trammuseum to Roodebeek and has been renamed as tram 8.

Education
In 1974, following the Leuven crisis, the Université catholique de Louvain (UCLouvain) moved its faculties of the Sector of Medical Sciences to the municipality, creating Brussels' second largest campus, UCLouvain Bruxelles Woluwe, with more than 14,000 students. It also founded a new hospital on site, the Cliniques universitaires Saint-Luc. The site includes a number of other educational institutions, like the Haute école Léonard de Vinci or the École pratique des hautes études commerciales (EPHEC).

Schools include:
 European School of Brussels II
 Don Bosco Middle School
 Athenée Royale de Woluwe-Saint-Lambert

Famous inhabitants
 Jules Malou, statesman and Prime Minister of Belgium
 Tarec Saffiedine (b. 1986), martial artist
 Georges Remi, also known as Hergé (1907–1983), comic book author, creator of The Adventures of Tintin

Born in Woluwe-Saint-Lambert:
 Prince Amedeo, Princess Maria Laura and Prince Joachim, born at the Cliniques universitaires Saint-Luc in 1986, 1988 and 1991 respectively.
 Rem: Princess Luisa Maria, and Princess Laetitia Maria were born in the Clinique Saint Jean in Brussels in 1995, and 2003, respectively.
 Princess Louise of Belgium and twins Prince Nicolas of Belgium and Prince Aymeric of Belgium, born at the Cliniques universitaires Saint-Luc in 2004 and 2005, respectively.
 Vincent Debaty (b. 1981), French rugby union footballer
 Twins Jonathan Borlée and Kevin Borlée, and their older sister Olivia Borlée, athletes

International relations

Twin towns and sister cities
Woluwe-Saint-Lambert is twinned with:
  Meudon, France
  Mbazi, Rwanda

See also
 Woluwe-Saint-Pierre (Sint-Pieters-Woluwe), an adjacent municipality
 Sint-Stevens-Woluwe, a district of an adjacent municipality
 White Star Woluwe F.C.

References

External links

 Official site of Woluwe-Saint-Lambert municipality (only in French or Dutch)
 Wolubilis cultural centre (only in French or Dutch)
 Hof ter Musschen (only in French or Dutch)
 Woluwe Shopping Centre
 University of Louvain - Woluwe

 
Municipalities of the Brussels-Capital Region
Populated places in Belgium